Muneer Sait (sometimes spelled Munir Sait, born 27 May 1940) is a retired Indian field hockey goalkeeper.

Sait was the goalkeeper of the Indian hockey team at the 1968 Mexico City Olympics.  The Indian team won the bronze medal that year.

Sait is from Chennai. He has been chosen as tournament director on more than one occasion. He was also chosen as a part of the five member selection committee by the Hockey India in 2009. He lives in Chennai and is also associated with the Squash Rackets Federation of Tamil Nadu.

For his work on field hockey, the International Hockey Federation awarded Sait the President's Award in 2005.

References

External links
 

1940 births
Living people
Field hockey players from Chennai
Male field hockey goalkeepers
Indian male field hockey players
Olympic field hockey players of India
Olympic bronze medalists for India
Olympic medalists in field hockey
Medalists at the 1968 Summer Olympics
Field hockey players at the 1968 Summer Olympics